The Kassam Pass is a road pass on the Highlands Highway in Papua New Guinea. The pass connects the Markham Valley to the fertile Highlands region and is administratively located in the Eastern Highlands Province.

The pass was originally constructed in the early 1950s by the Australian administration through the Department of District Services and Native Affairs under the guidance of engineer Rupert Roelof Haviland and Administrator Don Cleland. It was repaired and upgraded from 2017/18.

References 

Road transport in Papua New Guinea